Rhizochilus antipathum is a species of sea snail, a marine gastropod mollusk in the family Muricidae, the murex snails or rock snails.

Description
The shell size varies between 14 mm and 20 mm

Distribution
This species is distributed in the Indian Ocean along South Africa and in the Indo-West Pacific.

References

 Oliverio M. (2008) Coralliophilinae (Neogastropoda: Muricidae) from the southwest Pacific. In: V. Héros, R.H. Cowie & P. Bouchet (eds), Tropical Deep-Sea Benthos 25. Mémoires du Muséum National d'Histoire Naturelle 196: 481–585.
page(s): 519

Rhizochilus
Gastropods described in 1850